Diallylamine is the organic compound with the formula HN(CH2CH=CH2)2.  It is a colorless liquid with an ammonia-like odor.  It is multifunctional, featuring a secondary amine and two alkene groups.  Diallylamine is used in the production of N,N-diallyldichloroacetamide and N,N-diallyldimethylammonium chloride.

Preparation
It is produced commercially by partial hydrogenation of acrylonitrile: 
 2NCCH=CH2  +  4H2  →  HN(CH2CH=CH2)2  +  NH3

A laboratory route to diallylamine entails diallylation of calcium cyanamide followed by decyanation of the product.

Related compounds
Allylamine
Triallylamine

References

Amines
Allylamines